The following is a list and discussion of important scholarly resources relating to John Adams.

Biographical

 Abrams, Jeanne E. "John Adams: An American in Paris," ch. 1 of A View from Abroad: The Story of John and Abigail Adams in Europe (New York University Press, 2021) pp. 23–54. 
 Akers, Charles W. "John Adams" in Henry Graff, ed. (3rd ed. 2002). The Presidents: A Reference History. online
 Bernstein, Richard B. The Education of John Adams (Oxford University Press, 2020).
  
 
 
 
  Georgini,  Sara. Household Gods: The Religious Lives of the Adams Family (Oxford University Press, 2019) 
 
 Harness, Cheryl. The Revolutionary John Adams (National Geographic Books, 2006). 
 
 Mara, Wil. John Adams (Marshall Cavendish, 2009). 
 Morse, John Torrey. John Adams. (1899) old scholarly biography  online free
 Ryerson, Richard Alan, ed. (2001). John Adams and the Founding of the Republic 
 Ryerson, Richard Alan (2016). John Adams's Republic: The One, the Few, and the Many 555 pp 
 
 
 
 
 Waldstreicher, David, ed. (2013). A Companion to John Adams and John Quincy Adams, emphasis on historiography

Vice Presidency, Presidency and Federalist Party

 , the Quasi-War of 1798–1800
 Bernstein, R. B. "President John Adams and Four Chief Justices" New York Law School Law Review 57 (2012): 441+.
 Brown, Ralph A. The Presidency of John Adams. (2004) 
 Dunn, Susan. Jefferson's second revolution: the election crisis of 1800 and the triumph of republicanism (2004).
 
 Ferling, John Adams vs. Jefferson: The Tumultuous Election of 1800 (Oxford University Press, 2004). 
 Freeman, Joanne B. "The Election of 1800: A Study in the Logic of Political Change." Yale Law Journal 108.8 (1999) pp. 1959–1994. online
 Graber, Mark A. "Federalist or Friends of Adams: The Marshall Court and Party Politics." Studies in American Political Development 12.2 (1998): 229–266. online
 Heidenreich, Donald E. "Conspiracy Politics in the Election of 1796." New York History 92.3 (2011): 151–165. online
 
 Holder, Jean S. "The Sources of Presidential Power: John Adams and the Challenge to Executive Primacy." Political Science Quarterly 101.4 (1986): 601–616. online
 
 Kurtz, Stephen G. "The French Mission of 1799–1800: Concluding Chapter in the Statecraft of John Adams." Political Science Quarterly 80.4 (1965): 543–557. online
 Larson, Edward J. A magnificent catastrophe: the tumultuous election of 1800, America's first presidential campaign. (Simon and Schuster, 2007). 
 
 
 Miroff, Bruce. "John Adams' Classical Conception of the Executive." Presidential Studies Quarterly (1987): 365–382 online.
 Murphy, William J. "John Adams: The Politics of the Additional Army, 1798–1800." New England Quarterly (1979): 234–249. online
 
 Scherr, Arthur. "James Monroe and John Adams: An Unlikely “Friendship”." The Historian 67.3 (2005): 405–433.
 Sharp, James Roger. American Politics in the Early Republic: The New Nation in Crisis (Yale UP, 1993). 
 Sloan, Cliff, and David McKean. The great decision: Jefferson, Adams, Marshall, and the battle for the Supreme Court (PublicAffairs, 2010). 
 Smith, James Morton. "President John Adams, Thomas Cooper, and Sedition: A Case Study in Suppression." Mississippi Valley Historical Review 42.3 (1955): 438–465. online
 
 Thompson, Harry C. "The Second Place in Rome: John Adams as Vice President." Presidential Studies Quarterly 10.2 (1980): 171–178. online
 Turner, Kathryn. "Midnight judges." University of Pennsylvania Law Review 109 (1960): 494+ online.
 Turner, Kathryn. "The Appointment of Chief Justice Marshall." William and Mary Quarterly (1960): 144–163. online
 White, Leonard Duppe. The Federalists: A Study in Administrative History, (1956).

Books on the Founders

Political thought

 Fisher, Louis. "John Adams." in The Presidents and the Constitution, Volume One (New York University Press, 2020) pp. 34–46.
 Haraszti, Zoltan (1952). John Adams and the Prophets of Progress. 
 Howe, John R. Jr. (1966). The Changing Political Thought of John Adams 
 Morse, Anson D. "The Politics of John Adams." American Historical Review 4.2 (1899): 292–312. online free
 Rous, Sarah A. "Homo sum: John Adams Reads Terence." Classical World 113.3 (2020): 299–334.
 Scalia, Eugene. "John Adams, Legal Representation, and the 'Cancel Culture'." Harvard Journal of Law & Public Policy 44 (2021): 333+.

Other specialized studies

 
 
 
 
 
 Morris, Richard B. The peacemakers: The great powers and American independence (1965) Treaty of Paris 1783

Primary sources

 
 Adams, John, and Abigail Adams. Selected Letters of Abigail and John Adams (Courier Dover Publications, 2021). 
 Butterfield, L. H. et al., eds., The Adams Papers (1961– ). Multivolume letterpress edition of all letters to and from major members of the Adams family, plus their diaries; still incomplete. 
 "Founders Online" searchable edition
 Butterfield, L. H., ed. Adams Family Correspondence. Cambridge: Harvard University Press
 
 Carey, George W., ed. The Political Writings of John Adams. (2001) 
 John A. Schutz and Douglass Adair, eds. Spur of Fame, The Dialogues of John Adams and Benjamin Rush, 1805–1813 (1966) 
 C. Bradley Thompson, ed. Revolutionary Writings of John Adams, (2001) 
 Adams, John, (1774) Novanglus; or, A History of the Dispute with America. 
 Hogan, Margaret and C. James Taylor, eds. My Dearest Friend: Letters of Abigail and John Adams. Cambridge: Harvard University Press, 2007.
 Richardson, James D. ed. A Compilation of the Messages and Papers of the Presidents (1897), reprints his major messages and reports. 
 Taylor, Robert J. et al., eds. Papers of John Adams. Cambridge: Harvard University Press
 Wroth, L. Kinvin and Hiller B. Zobel, eds. The Legal Papers of John Adams. Cambridge: Harvard University Press

Analysis

Adams' grandson Charles Francis Adams Sr. edited the first two volumes of The Works of John Adams, Esq., Second President of the United States. These were published between 1850 and 1856 by Charles C. Little and James Brown in Boston. The first seven chapters were produced by John Quincy Adams.

The premier modern biography was Honest John Adams, a 1933 biography by the noted French specialist in American history Gilbert Chinard, who came to Adams after writing his acclaimed 1929 biography of Jefferson. For a generation, Chinard's work was regarded as the best life of Adams, and it is still an important text in illustrating the themes of Adams' biographical and historical scholarship. Following the opening of the Adams family papers in the 1950s, Page Smith published the first major biography to use these previously inaccessible primary sources; his biography won a 1962 Bancroft Prize but was criticized for its scanting of Adams' intellectual life and its diffuseness. In 1975, Peter Shaw published The Character of John Adams, a thematic biography noted for its psychological insight into Adams' life. The 1992 character study by Joseph Ellis, Passionate Sage: The Character and Legacy of John Adams, was Ellis's first major publishing success and remains one of the most useful and insightful studies of Adams' personality. In 1992, the Revolutionary War historian and biographer John E. Ferling published his acclaimed John Adams: A Life, also noted for its psychological sensitivity. David McCullough authored the 2001 biography John Adams, which won various awards and was the basis for a 2008 TV miniseries.

Bernard Bailyn on the Adams Papers
Two years after a review on the Jefferson Papers, historian Bernard Bailyn published "Butterfield's Adams: Notes for a Sketch" (1962), a review of the first four volumes of the Adams Papers, including the Diary and Autobiography of John Adams, edited by Lyman Butterfield as well as editorial assistants Leonard Faber and Wendell Garrett. Butterfield released the volumes on September 21, 1961, to great fanfare in newspaper reviews, advertisements, Massachusetts Historical Society receptions, American Academy of Arts dinners, and a Washington, D.C.  luncheon with President John F. Kennedy. Bailyn prefaced his own review with disdainful comments on the "vagueness of the impression left" by the publicity and hype, as well as a cautionary observation that the "vagueness" could counterintuitively add the volumes to the "great slag-heap of unread scholarship."

In Bailyn's sketch for this  William and Mary Quarterly review, John Adams embodied a jumble of ambitions, fears, desires, irrationalities, and integrities. In the first four volumes of his Papers, at least, Bailyn assessed Adams as a man who constantly engaged in "dramatic objectification of himself and the world he saw," with bombastic "humor" that "flowed naturally." But it was the "problems and tensions" that ostensibly caught Bailyn by surprise---"between ambition and integrity, between the desire to appear knowing and sophisticated and the inability to be so, between the longing to retreat into a sensitive inner world of feeling and the need for self-mastery." Adams experienced an "extended adolescence" that came to an abrupt end "around his thirtieth year," close to the time he courted and wed Abigail Adams née Smith. Both the Diary and Autobiography, according to Bailyn, evinced this change, which was a crucial  facet in or "our early national history." Change, however, was not transformation. The "problems and tensions" prior to this shift, in Bailyn's sketch, "continued to shape his, and in part the nation's, history." Adams was still a man of "stubborn" and "flamboyant, integrity...and he never lost his sensuous, physical response to the things and the people around him." Adams almost perpetually guarded his vulnerable "self-esteem" with frequent "self-assertion," a defensive posturing that eventually became "paranoiac" during the last quarter of the eighteenth century.

As Bailyn's fledgling interpretations of the Stamp Act Crisis and the "meaning of certain of the ideals and ideas of the American Revolution" engulfed this world of John Adams, conspiratorial thought abounded. For Bailyn's sketch, the perception and conception of conspiracy in the John Adams Diary became both cause and consequence of "abstractions---glittering generalities," bound to a "concreteness," a "sensuous imagination and tactile grasp of reality...by 1774 he was convinced that he was witnessing the culmination of a deliberate conspiracy 'against the public liberty...first regularly formed and begun to be executed in 1763 or 4.' The result, unless the plot were exposed and destroyed, would be tyranny---not some vague, unfamiliar historical tyranny but one imposed by people he knew, executed by hands he had shaken." For the Adams in Bailyn's sketch, Massachusetts Royal Governor Thomas Hutchinson clearly had deployed "influence to advance not only his own career but that of his personal following 'to the exclusion of much better men.' " When Hutchinson and his "place seeking" collided with the apocalyptic duties and acts imposed by King-in-Parliament after the French and Indian War, "Adams's social animosities took fire and became the source of a flaming hatred of state authority."

Bailyn's conclusion to the review turned John Adams psychologically inward and then constitutionally outward---gasping, grasping, writing, and theorizing for "control." After "long years of raking self-examination and an extraordinary sensitivity to other people's feelings and motivations," Bailyn's sketch envisioned an Adams who "saw more darkness than light" and "powerful irrationalities" in the "human passions" that were his own, yet also grappled with this "flaming hatred of state authority." As result, "his political theory was an effort to express in the constitutional language of his day the implications of this dark, introspective psychology." In this regard, Bailyn averred, Adams seemed more akin to "Calvinist forebears and of the twentieth century than of the eighteenth-century Enlightenment."  Bailyn's comparisons to "political theory," resting on "dark, introspective" psychological implications "of the twentieth century," requires further scholarly inquiry. In any case, this "political theory" made Adams into "a passionate advocate of the separation of powers---governmental and social---and of maintaining a competitive balance among them." Adams the constitutional architect believed that "behavior by the favored few would continue to exist; it could not be eliminated; but it might be controlled, to some extent at least, by confining its expression...allow the aristocracy, however it might be defined [class or rank?], a legal, constitutional role in government, but limit it to a special institution, the traditional middle chamber." Conversely, or perhaps self-critically, Adams proposed another chamber to "control" and mutually counterweigh, in state authority, "the force of the many as well as of the few…the popular element of the constitution must also be constrained, sealed off, confined. It too must be subject to law interpreted by a fully independent judiciary and enforced by a powerful, impartial, in effect disciplinarian, executive." In the final analysis, Bailyn's sketch of Adams depicted a man who feared in humanity, and perhaps more in himself, "those elements of ambition, of irrationality, and of sensuous satisfaction with which he had fought so fiercely and so knowingly...He knew no peace, and saw no peace for mankind, until they too were brought under control."

References

Adams, John
Adams, John
Adams, John